Victoria L. Sullivan (born June 21, 1968) is an American politician in the state of New Hampshire. She was a member of the New Hampshire House of Representatives, sitting as a Republican from the Hillsborough 16 district, having been first elected in 2014. She lost reelection in 2018. Sullivan announced that she was running for Mayor of Manchester in April 2021. She previously ran for Mayor in 2019, but lost to incumbent Joyce Craig. She attended Northern Essex Community College and Medway High School.

References

External links
 New Hampshire House of Representatives - Victoria Sullivan

1968 births
21st-century American women politicians
Candidates in the 2021 United States elections
Living people
Republican Party members of the New Hampshire House of Representatives
Women state legislators in New Hampshire
21st-century American politicians